Highway Patrol is a 1938 American action film, directed by Charles C. Coleman. It stars Robert Paige, Julie Bishop, and Robert Middlemass.

References

External links
Highway Patrol at the Internet Movie Database

1938 films
American action films
1930s action films
Films directed by Charles C. Coleman
American black-and-white films
Columbia Pictures films
1930s American films